Arthur Searcy (6 January 1852 near Mount Barker, South Australia – 9 December 1935 in Harrow Road, St Peters, South Australia) was President of the Public Service, Deputy Commissioner of Taxes and Stamps and President of the Marine Board in South Australia.

Life and career 
Arthur Searcy was a son of William Searcy and his wife Charlotte Edwin née Roffe. His parents, and uncle Frederick Searcy, had arrived at Port Adelaide on 3 September 1849, on the ship Louisa Baillie . William Searcy was Chief Inspector of Police in South Australia.
Arthur Searcy went to Pulteney Street School in Adelaide and was also educated by Dr. Sweatman in Port Lincoln.

He married Emily Louisa Payne (1855–1932), on 2 December 1871 at the residence of J. Kither of Norwood.

His first employment was by the legal firm of Stow & Bruce and later in the office of Brown & Thompson. Like his younger brother Alfred, he joined the Customs Department as a temporary hand, but his position was soon made permanent. His career developed as follows:
 Boarding Officer for Customs, 1873
 Clerk Customs, 1874
 Clerk Audit office, 1875
 Clerk Customs, 1876
 Tide Inspector and measurer of ships, Customs, 1889
 Corresponding Clerk Customs and Sea Marine Board, 1890
 Acting Deputy Commissioner of Taxes and Stamps, 1891
 Customs and Marine Board in 1894
 Clerk Assistant and Sergeant at Arms, House of Assembly, 1895
 Deputy Commissioner of Taxes and Stamps, 1897
 Deputy Commissioner of Taxes, 1901
 Press Marine and Board, 1902
 Inspector of kerosene, 1902
 Commissioner of Trade Marks and Registrar of Copyrights, 1904
 Controller of the Outer Harbour at Port Adelaide, 1907
 Controller of Ocean Steamers Wharf, 1909
 Chief Inspector under Inflammable Oils Act, 1909
 Superintendent of Life Saving Service, 1909
 Controller of Harbours and Chairman of Harbours Board Committee, 1911
 Retirement, 1917

Arthur Searcy created the scheme for the acquisition of wharfs and harbours by the government, and all of the wharfs were taken over under his guidance.

Arthur Searcy was highly respected and rather wealthy. He was invited to many functions. He attended for instance together with the Governor of South Australia the Coronation of King Edward VII and Queen Alexandra on 26 June 1902, the Coronation of King George V and Queen Mary on 24 May 1911, a memorial service for King Edward VII on 20 May 1910; the Mayor Easter Excursion on the River Murray on 5 April 1897; the official opening of the Electric Tramways system in Port Adelaide, during which he rode in the first car together with the Mayor J. Sweeney and members of the City Council. He was also invited to the Inauguration of Electric Lighting on the Brighton Jetty on 20 January 1917.

Upon his death he donated the Searcy Collection to the State Library of South Australia, containing three metres of scrapbooks (1892–1923), which include newspaper cuttings, obituaries and reminiscences etc. in 20 volumes as well as a total of 19,837 photographs, which he had taken himself or collected.

Searcy Bay on the west coast of Eyre Peninsula was named after him in 1908.

References

External links
The Searcy Collection at the State Library of South Australia

History of South Australia
1852 births
1935 deaths
Public servants of South Australia
Burials at West Terrace Cemetery
People from Mount Barker, South Australia